Paradigm Shift is an album by various artists and recorded under the Nettwerk and Subconscious Communications record labels. It is Subconscious Communications' tenth release. The album also contains unreleased tracks that artist Dwayne Goettel never lived to see produced.

Track listing
Tracks are listed in numerical order, title, running time and artist.
"Power" – 8:00 (aDuck)
"Touched" – 4:40 (Philth)
"Zonk Lift" – 4:40 (Download)
"Grasshopper" – 4:47 (PlatEAU)
"ZXY World" – 4:54 (Doubting Thomas)
"Georgie the Parasite" – 3:56 (The Tear Garden)
"Glae Bastards" – 4:36 (Dead Voices on Air)
"Beflepia" – 4:16 (Kone)
"Blowfish (Remix)" – 4:53 (Doubting Thomas)
"Burnout" – 5:31 (aDuck)
"Melt" – 4:17 (Skinny Puppy)
"Message 3" – 2:07 (The Tear Garden)

See also
 Wild Planet, another Subconscious compilation.

External links
 Arachnet.com information regarding Paradigm Shift.

Record label compilation albums
1997 compilation albums
Industrial compilation albums